Siddharth Vipin is an Indian composer, who mainly produces film scores and soundtracks in the Tamil film industry. He recently married Shriya Mohandas.

Early life
Siddharth was born in Salem,Tamil Nadu. Finished his schooling in Muscat, Oman, he chose to attend Loyola College, Chennai for a B.Com degree and also is a professional Sound Engineer from SAE Institute. He lost his father, Vipin Chandra in 2005. He is the nephew of Radha Vinod Raju.

Career
He worked as a sound engineer for the Delhi-based rock band Euphoria and also worked on the sound effects for some Indian version of Hollywood films. He was selected to do the sound designing for Major Ravi's Mission 90 Days (2007) and also acted as the Indian Prime Minister Rajiv Gandhi. Siddharth Vipin then made his composing debut in Major Ravi's next Malayalam war film Kurukshetra (2008), gaining positive reviews for his work.

Siddharth's debut in Tamil was Naduvula Konjam Pakkatha Kaanom (2012)He composed the background score for the movie. Behindwoods.com wrote "His naughty and playful tunes during the serious scenes trigger laughter.". The Hindu wrote "His background score is just perfect. Especially, the tune for the scene in which Saras is moved after learning about Prem’s faith in him, is brilliant."

After NKPK, the same producers offered him work on their next film Idharkuthane Aasaipattai Balakumara. Idhaaba went on to become a huge hit and Siddharth's music was a huge factor in the success of the film. Rediff wrote "The Enge Ponaalum (Prayer Song), which has become hugely popular among youngsters, has some very hilarious lyrics.". Behindwoods wrote "Siddharth Vippin's music had already reached out to the public even before the movie released. The prayer song and the London bridge song are the pick of songs that have been accepted by the people with a loud applause." Indiaglitz said"Siddharth's music is another relishing factor, up's the aroma of the entire movie."

He went on to win the Edison Award for Best New Music Director for the movie. 
Siddharth also did a cameo in the film as Akhilesh. This unexpected role from him became a huge hit among the masses.

The success of the film meant that Santhanam chose him to sign him for Vallavanukku Pullum Aayudham (2014). VPA is the remake of the Telugu blockbuster Maryada Ramanna.
Behindwoods.com wrote "Siddharth Vipin's music gives the movie a convincing commercial lift, especially the background scores, which include tiny vocals like "Maatikittaan" that enhance the reach of the certain comedy scenes". Indiaglitz said "As for music, Siddharth Vipin marks his stand again, after Idharkuthaane Aasaipattai Balakumara. His tunes are unique and the score is creative for every emotion portrayed in the movie." 
Likewise, he played a supporting comedy role, featuring in the train sequence as an Anglo-Indian friend of the character played by Rajakumaran. Siddharth was appreciated for his acting as well, with Indiaglitz saying "The train sequence that features Siddharth Vipin and team can be considered as one of the best sequences in the movie".

Filmography

As actor

As composer

#Soundtrack by another composer

 The films are listed so that the music released, regardless of the dates the film released.
 The year next to the title of the affected films indicates the release year of the either dubbed or remade version in the named language later than the original version.
 • indicates original language release. Indicates simultaneous makes, if featuring in more languages

References

Year of birth missing (living people)
Tamil comedians
Tamil male actors
Living people
Tamil musicians
Tamil film score composers